Rogaine may refer to:

 Rogaine, one brand of minoxidil, a hair-regrowth medication
 Rogaining, a team sport of cross-country navigation